A nitrate nitrite, or nitrite nitrate, is a coordination complex or other chemical compound that contains both nitrite and nitrate anions (NO3− and NO2−). They are mixed-anion compounds, and they are mixed-valence compounds. Some have third anions. Many nitrite nitrate compounds are coordination complexes of cobalt. Such a substance was discovered by Wolcott Gibbs and Frederick Genth in 1857.

Production 
Mercuric nitrate and potassium nitrate in water solution produce the potassium mercuric compound K3[Hg(NO2)4]NO3.

Properties 
On heating, nitrate nitrites lose NO2 and NO and yield metal oxides.

Related 
Other compounds having an element in two different anion states include the sulfate sulfites, the phosphate phosphites, and the selenate selenites.

List

References 

Nitrates
Nitrites